Andrew Howard Jones (born 9 May 1959) is a former New Zealand cricketer. From 1987 to 1995 he played in 39 Tests and 87 ODI, for New Zealand. At domestic level, he played for Central Districts, Otago, and Wellington.

Schoolboy career

Andrew Jones attended Nelson College from 1972 to 1976, and was a member of the school's 1st XI cricket team for four years. He was awarded the Wood Cup for best all-round athlete at the college in 1975.

International career
It wasn't until the age of 27 that he made his Test debut for New Zealand, on 16 April 1987 against Sri Lanka. He became a solid No. 3 batsman, where he played all but 4 of his Test innings. New Zealand only won six of the 39 Tests in which he played. Jones's batting style was characterised by an unusual but effective jumping method against short deliveries.

He was a batsman who was difficult to dismiss when set, he scored over 140 in five of his seven hundreds. He had a strong record against subcontinental sides, against India he scored 401 runs at 50.13 and made 625 runs at 62.50 against the Sri Lankans. It was against the Sri Lankans that he made his highest Test score of 186 in Wellington. With Martin Crowe, Jones made a partnership of 467 which became a Test record as the highest partnership by any side for any wicket. The innings came in a prolific period for Jones as he made 122 and an unbeaten 100 in his next two Test innings. Jones is currently the only New Zealand batsman to have ever scored 3 hundreds in consecutive innings.

Despite maintaining an average of 35.69 in 87 ODI innings, he never scored a century in that format of the game. His highest score of 93 came in Sharjah against Bangladesh. Jones was New Zealand's second highest runscorer at the 1992 Cricket World Cup.

References

External links
 

New Zealand One Day International captains
New Zealand One Day International cricketers
Cricketers at the 1987 Cricket World Cup
Cricketers at the 1992 Cricket World Cup
New Zealand Test cricketers
New Zealand cricketers
Central Districts cricketers
Otago cricketers
Wellington cricketers
1959 births
Living people
People educated at Nelson College
North Island cricketers